The Fleetwings BQ-1 was an early expendable unmanned aerial vehicle — referred to at the time as an "assault drone" — developed by Fleetwings during the Second World War for use by the United States Army Air Forces. Only a single example of the type was built, the program being cancelled following the crash of the prototype on its first flight.

Development
Development of the BQ-1 began on July 10, 1942, under a program for the development of "aerial torpedoes" – unmanned aircraft carrying internal bombs – that had been instigated in March of that year. Fleetwings was contracted to build a single XBQ-1 assault drone, powered by two Franklin O-405-7 opposed piston engines, and fitted with a fixed landing gear in tricycle configuration. The aircraft was optionally piloted; a single-seat cockpit was installed for ferry and training flights; a fairing would replace the cockpit canopy on operational missions. A single BQ-2 was to be constructed as well under the same contract.

Flight testing
Following trials of the television-based command guidance system using a PQ-12 target drone, and earlier trials of the XBQ-2A, the XBQ-1 flew in May 1944; however, the aircraft crashed on its maiden flight.  Following the loss of the lone prototype BQ-1, the project was cancelled.

Specifications (XBQ-1)

See also

References

Notes

Bibliography

BQ-1
1940s United States bomber aircraft
Unmanned aerial vehicles of the United States
World War II guided missiles of the United States
Cancelled military aircraft projects of the United States
High-wing aircraft
Aircraft first flown in 1944
Twin piston-engined tractor aircraft